Carden H. Summers (born August 27, 1957) is an American politician from Georgia. Summers is a Republican member of the Georgia State Senate for District 13.

References

Republican Party Georgia (U.S. state) state senators
21st-century American politicians
Living people
1957 births